Sterling, Virginia, refers most specifically to a census-designated place (CDP) in Loudoun County, Virginia, United States. The population of the CDP as of the 2010 United States Census was 27,822. The CDP boundaries are confined to a relatively small area between Virginia State Route 28 on the west and Virginia State Route 7 on the northeast, excluding areas near SR 606 and the Dulles Town Center.

A much wider region has a preferred mailing address of "Sterling, Virginia", per the United States Postal Service. Other localities included within this larger area include Arcola, Cascades, Countryside, Dulles, Dulles Town Center, Oak Grove, and Sugarland Run. The "Greater Sterling" region includes part of Washington Dulles International Airport and the former AOL corporate headquarters. Greater Sterling is also home to the National Weather Service Weather Forecast Office LWX (serving the Baltimore–Washington Metropolitan Area), as well as the Sterling Field Support Center, the National Weather Service test, research, and evaluation center for weather instruments.

The following includes information covering both the CDP and the wider "Greater Sterling" region.

History

Route7, also known as Leesburg Pike, bordered what used to be Jesse Hughes's dairy farm. Hughes arrived in Loudoun County in the early 20th century and was a longtime head of the county's Democrats. Fred Franklin Tavenner, who was somewhat related to Benjamin Franklin, operated vast stretches of Sterling Farm at the southwest fringes of Sterling Park. Tavenner had purchased land from Albert Shaw Jr., who had inherited it from his father Albert B. Shaw, editor and publisher of the American Review of Reviews. One of Shaw's spreads, totaling , was called "The Experimental Farm" because it was one of the first area farms to receive a U.S. grant for applying "scientific methods", as Tavenner called them. According to Tavenner, refugees from the Soviet Union ran the farm while Shaw remained in New York City.

Dulles International Airport and the extension of water and sewer lines to the airport began to change the landscape when construction started in 1959. During the same year, Marvin T. Broyhill Jr. and his father made plans to develop land in the airport area under the company M.T. Broyhill & Sons Corporation. In late 1961, they decided to buy and incorporated Sterling Park Development Corporation with his son Marvin T. Broyhill as president, and cousin Thomas J. Broyhill as vice president. Between April 28 and December 29 of 1961, they purchased  in 14parcels for $2,115,784. For the  Hughes farm along Route7, they paid .

M.T. Broyhill & Sons Corporation learned where the right-of-way for Route28 (Sully Road) would be, and hoped to develop Sterling Park on both sides of it, so they would not have to build a road through Sterling Park. However, Powell B. Harrison, who was instrumental in planning Route28, insisted that the road be kept generally free of development, for easy access to the airport. Therefore, the Broyhills developed Sterling Park east of Route28, and had to build their own through road, today's Sterling Boulevard.

Marvin Broyhill, Jr.'s marketing thoughts were to "put together a prefabricated home marketed by U.S. Steel and sell it for about $17,000  $3,000 less than a comparable Fairfax County home ... All homes to have airconditioning. Homeowners to have access without membership fees to golf and tennis courts and pools." Air conditioning was uncommon in homes of that price range at the time. Broyhill's ideas, except for free golf, are realities today. As selling points, Loudoun's taxes were less than half of Fairfax's taxes, Washington was a half-hour away, and the elder Broyhill had envisioned commuter trains on the Washington and Old Dominion Railroad (which, since 1951, had carried only freight). The railroad tracks were the southern boundary of the present Sterling Park.

Initially, Sterling Park residents had to be of the "Caucasian race." No board member or speaker before the board raised an objection to the clause, a common one in the United States before the 1960s, when discriminatory housing was outlawed by the Fair Housing Act, which was enacted as a follow-up to the Civil Rights Act of 1964. No African American family moved into Sterling Park until August 1966, when the illegality of the clause became apparent. By then, the population of "The Park", as it had come to be known, had reached 5,000.

The Broad Run Bridge and Tollhouse, Vestal's Gap Road and Lanesville Historic District, and Arcola Elementary School are listed on the National Register of Historic Places.

Geography
The original center of Sterling is located at 39°00'22.4"N 77°25'43.0"W. Sterling is part of the Chesapeake Bay watershed, and Greater Sterling borders the Potomac River.

Communities
 Broad Run Farms is a residential area north of Virginia State Route 7 and28 that was founded in 1952. It shares the ZIP code of 20165 which uses "Sterling" or "Potomac Falls" as recommended addresses. As an area much older than the surrounding recent growth, it has features unique to the region, including large lots, highly wooded old-growth trees, a wide variety of housing and a voluntary civic association. The Potomac River forms its northern border, and Broad Run its western. A U.S. Senate lawyer bought the Miskel farm in 1950 and later subdivided it, founding Broad Run Farms. The Civil War Skirmish at Miskel Farm propelled Confederate Captain John S. Mosby to fame. The community banded together in 1995, with state and county help, to finance and install its own sewer service, in part through an added property tax. The lien was paid off several years early and the tax has now been retired.
 Cascades is a  planned community within the 20165 ZIP code. The area is located in the northeasternmost part of Loudoun County, between the Fairfax County line to the east, the Potomac River to the north, and Algonkian Parkway to the south. Located just north of Route7, along the Algonkian Parkway, approximately 6500 homes comprise the community.
 Countryside is a housing development in Sterling (20165 ZIP code), bounded by the Potomac River to the north and by Route7 (Leesburg Pike) to the south. This subdivision was conceived in the middle 1970s when  of farmland was divided in preparation for a planned housing development. Homes construction began in 1983 and continued through 1991. Countryside contains a shopping center anchored by Safeway and CVS. The shopping center is within the mixed-use Countryside Commercial and Professional Center, which contains various office buildings. Countryside is governed by the CountrySide Proprietary, the community's homeowners association.
 Dulles is an unincorporated area in Loudoun County, with ZIP code 20166. The headquarters of Orbital ATK (on Warp Drive), ODIN Technologies, the former headquarters of MCI Inc., and AOL are located in Dulles. The usage of Dulles as a community name began in the mid-1980s when Loudoun County economic development officer Pam Treadwell successfully lobbied the United States Postal Service to allow Sterling businesses and residents to use Dulles as an alternate address. Dulles Town Center is a census-designated place located within Dulles, which contains the Dulles Town Center shopping mall.
 Lowes Island is an advertised portion of the legal subdivision of Cascades, but is not a legal subdivision itself. While newer residents use the city address "Potomac Falls, VA", the post office will recognize either "Potomac Falls, VA" or "Sterling, VA" as a correct mailing address. Almost 50% of the Lowes Island geography is occupied by club grounds and a golf course.
 Potomac Falls is another name for the unincorporated area along the Potomac River in the northernmost portion of Sterling with the ZIP code of 20165, bordering Maryland. It contains the census-designated places of Countryside, Cascades, and Lowes Island. The name for Potomac Falls came from a competition to name the second new post office in Sterling. Alternately called Potomac Falls or Sterling, the village consists of the communities of Glen Heather, Calvert's Glen, Cascades, Countryside, Lowes Island, Rivercrest, Potomac Hunt, Great Falls Forest and Great Falls Chase.  Development of Potomac Falls began in the late 1980s, and is essentially complete today.  Potomac Falls borders Great Falls and Fairfax County to the southeast and has several shopping areas, schools, and community centers. Potomac Falls is also home to three 18-hole golf courses including Trump National Golf Club and is home to the Potomac Falls High School Panthers.
 Sterling Park is a portion of Sterling with the ZIP code of 20164. The land where Sterling Park was built was mainly made up of a few very large farms.  When construction of Dulles International Airport began in 1959, land prices began to rise. In 1961, Marvin T. Broyhill Sr. saw this as a great investment opportunity and decided to buy the  that now make up Sterling Park . Construction of homes priced $14,800 to $22,500 was completed by 1967. Sterling Park was one of the first planned communities built in eastern Loudoun County and was a popular place for government workers to settle with their families outside Washington, D.C. Sterling Park also contains a variety of businesses, churches, parks, a community center, a semi-private golf club with schools, tennis courts, and two swimming pools. It is the home of the Park View High School Patriots.
 Sugarland Run is a portion of Sterling with the ZIP code of 20164. Built in the 1970s in the style of Sterling Park, its shopping center consists of a 7-Eleven store and gas station, Pizza Hut, Panda West, High Up Food Mart, and a laundromat (which burned down on January 10, 2008). There is also a community swimming pool and playground situated across from the lake. Sugarland Run also is a geographical feeder to Dominion High School.

Economy
Sterling is home to many businesses and also serves as branch offices for many major companies. According to Manta, the following companies, with annual revenues of $20million or more, have headquarters in Sterling, Virginia: Neustar and Electronic Instrumentation and Technology. Companies that have a branch office or headquarters in Sterling, with a total number of employees over 1,000 or more are as follows: Alcatel-Lucent, Geo Trans, HR Solutions LLC, M.C. Dean, Inc., National Electronics Warranty Corp,  Service Companies Inc, and Orbital Science.

Federal agencies with offices in Sterling include U.S. Customs and Border Protection, the Bureau of Safety and Environmental Enforcement, and the Drug Enforcement Administration.

At one time, Atlantic Coast Airlines had its headquarters in Sterling.

Education
Currently, Sterling is home to three public high schools serving grades 9-12: Dominion High School, Park View High School, and Potomac Falls High School. Sterling also has three public middle schools serving grades 6-8: River Bend Middle School, Seneca Ridge Middle School, and Sterling Middle School. There are also twelve public elementary schools serving grades PK-5: Algonkian Elementary School, Countryside Elementary School, Forest Grove Elementary School, Guilford Elementary School, Horizon Elementary School, Lowes Island Elementary School, Meadlowland Elementary School, Potowmack Elementary School, Rolling Ridge Elementary School, Sterling Elementary School, Sugarland Elementary School, and Sully Elementary School.

Higher education
Northern Virginia Community College has a Loudoun campus on Harry F. Byrd Highway (Route7). Nearby, in Ashburn, The George Washington University has its Virginia Science and Technology Campus, established in 1991.

Transportation
The main arterial roads serving Sterling are Route28, West Church Road, South Sterling Boulevard, Leesburg Pike, Algonkian Parkway, Potomac View Road, Waxpool Road, and Cascades Parkway.

Recreation
Claude Moore Park occupies  in Sterling and offers activities for people of all ages, with three main areas. Claude Moore Recreation Center contains an Olympic-size indoor pool, a children's pool with water features, an exercise area, gymnasium, and several event and meeting rooms. The sportplex includes baseball and softball fields and the nature area includes hiking trails and the park. The last known undeveloped section of the historic Vestal's Gap Road runs across the park. Originally a trail first used by Native Americans, it was a major route for settlers between Alexandria and the Shenandoah Valley. George Washington used the road frequently in his travels between Mount Vernon and the western frontier. General Braddock's troops, including Daniel Boone, traveled Vestal's Gap Road during the French and Indian War.

Sterling offers the following parks and clubs as recreational areas: Algonkian Regional Park, Dulles Golf Center& Sports Park, and Sterling Golf Club.

Public works and services
Fire protection services are provided by the Sterling Volunteer Fire Company. Technical Rescue and Emergency Medical Services are provided by the Sterling Volunteer Rescue Squad. Both are non-governmental 501(c) non-profit organizations that operate as a part of the Loudoun County Combined Fire and Rescue System, and share three stations: one in Sterling Park, one in Potomac Falls, and one in Kincora at the northern end of Pacific Boulevard. The Loudoun County Sheriff's Office and the Virginia State Police provide law enforcement.

Notable people
Famous people who were born in or who lived in Sterling include:
 United States President James Buchanan had his summer home near what is now Ruritan Circle.
 Hilarie Burton, actress from the television programs One Tree Hill and White Collar
 Billy King, former general manager for the Brooklyn Nets of the NBA
 Patton Oswalt, stand-up comedian
 Pg. 99, a screamo band formed in 1999
 Conor Shanosky, a former United States men's national under-20 soccer team football player, who operated commonly as midfielder and defender, who was a D.C. United player; currently plays for Richmond Kickers
 Austin St. John, actor and martial artist from the Mighty Morphin Power Rangers television series, who left acting to work as a paramedic and study martial arts
Cameron Whitten, community activist

Climate
The climate in this area is characterized by hot, humid summers and generally mild to cool winters.  According to the Köppen Climate Classification system, Sterling has a humid subtropical climate, abbreviated "Cfa" on climate maps.

See also

Willard, Virginia, adjacent village displaced for construction of Dulles Airport
Algonkian Writers Conference, at Algonkian Park in Sterling

References

External links

Dulles International Airport History

Census-designated places in Loudoun County, Virginia
Census-designated places in Virginia
Washington metropolitan area
Virginia populated places on the Potomac River